West Rowan High School is a public, co-educational secondary school located in Mount Ulla, North Carolina. It is one of seven high schools in the Rowan-Salisbury School System.

School information
For the 2010–2011 school year, West Rowan High School had a total population of 1,154 students and 68.57 teachers on a (FTE) basis. The student population had a gender ratio of 51.96% male to 48.04% female. The demographic group makeup of the student population was: White, 64.02%; Black, 22.10%; Hispanic, 10.78%; Asian/Pacific Islander, 0.37%; and American Indian, 0.27% (two or more races, 2.47%). For the same school year, 48.95% of the students received free or reduced-cost lunches.

Athletics
West Rowan is a 3A school in the South Piedmont Conference.

The school's men's basketball team has won three state titles overall, including consecutive championships in 2002 & 2003.

From 2008 to 2010, the football team won three straight State 3A Championships. They made it to the State Championship in 2011 where they lost to Havelock. They went undefeated in 2009 and 2010 and had a 46-game winning streak that was broken in 2011.

Awards
In the 1990–1991 school year, West Rowan was listed as a Blue Ribbon School.

Notable alumni
 Dave Drechsler, NFL offensive guard
 John Milem, NFL defensive end
 Barry Moore, Major League Baseball pitcher
 Keshun Sherrill, professional basketball player
 Chris Smith, NFL defensive end

References

External links

Educational institutions established in 1960
Public high schools in North Carolina
Schools in Rowan County, North Carolina
1960 establishments in North Carolina